Jessie King may refer to:

 Jessie King, basketball player for the Purefoods Tender Juicy Giants
 Jessie King (hanged 1889), babyfarmer and subject of an early essay by writer William Roughead 
 Jessie M. King (1875–1949), Scottish painter and illustrator
 Jessie King (writer) (1862–?), Scottish writer